Saskatoon Southeast is a provincial electoral district for the Legislative Assembly of Saskatchewan, Canada. Since a boundary redraw in 2013, it currently encompasses the Saskatoon neighbourhoods of Lakeridge, Lakeview, Lakewood and Rosewood as well as portions of Wildwood and Briarwood.

Originally created for the 22nd Saskatchewan general election in 1991 as "Saskatoon Wildwood", the district previously encompassed the Wildwood, Rosewood, Lakewood, Briarwood, The Willows and Stonebridge neighbourhoods of Saskatoon; as well as the rural communities of Grasswood, Floral, Furdale and part of the Rural Municipality of Corman Park.

The incumbent member of the Legislative Assembly of Saskatchewan for Saskatoon Southeast is Don Morgan. He was first elected in 2003 in the 25th Saskatchewan general election and was re-elected in 2007, 2011 and 2016. He was re-elected to a fifth consecutive term in the 29th Saskatchewan general election that took place on October 26, 2020.

Members of the Legislative Assembly

Election results 

|-

|NDP
|Zubair Sheikh
|align="right"|2,068
|align="right"|19.32
|align="right"|-9.11

|- bgcolor="white"
!align="left" colspan=3|Total
!align="right"|10,706
!align="right"|100.00
!align="right"|

|-

|NDP
|Jane Wollenberg
|align="right"|2,954
|align="right"|28.43
|align="right"|-4.52

|- bgcolor="white"
!align="left" colspan=3|Total
!align="right"|10,392
!align="right"|100.00
!align="right"|

|-

|NDP
|John Conway
|align="right"|2,730
|align="right"|32.95
|align="right"|-5.30

|- bgcolor="white"
!align="left" colspan=3|Total
!align="right"|8,286
!align="right"|100.00
!align="right"|

|-

| style="width: 130px" |NDP
|Pat Lorje
|align="right"|3,172
|align="right"|38.25
|align="right"|-10.74

|- bgcolor="white"
!align="left" colspan=3|Total
!align="right"|8,293
!align="right"|100.00
!align="right"|

|-

| style="width: 130px" |NDP
|Pat Lorje
|align="right"|3,450
|align="right"|48.99
|align="right"|+5.80

|Prog. Conservative
|Marcel Guay
|align="right"|682
|align="right"|9.69
|align="right"|-15.62
|- bgcolor="white"
!align="left" colspan=3|Total
!align="right"|7,042
!align="right"|100.00
!align="right"|

|-

| style="width: 130px" |NDP
|Pat Lorje
|align="right"|4,282
|align="right"|43.19
|align="right"|*

|Prog. Conservative
|Joan Black
|align="right"|2,509
|align="right"|25.31
|align="right"|*
|- bgcolor="white"
!align="left" colspan=3|Total
!align="right"|9,914
!align="right"|100.00
!align="right"|

References

External links 
 Website of the Legislative Assembly of Saskatchewan
 Elections Saskatchewan: Official Results of the 2007 Provincial Election By Electoral Division
 Elections Saskatchewan: Official Results of the 2011 Provincial Election
 Saskatchewan Archives Board: Saskatchewan Election Results By Electoral Division

Saskatchewan provincial electoral districts
Politics of Saskatoon